WRJQ is a polka music formatted internet radio station.

Launched in January 2006, WRJQ features a wide variety of polka music, but primarily plays the "Midwest Oompah" sound featuring the Dutchmen-style and Czech/Bohemian-style.

Aaron Schuelke from Appleton, Wisconsin, United States, owns and operates WRJQ. Studios are located in his house on the north side of Appleton.

This internet-only station is named in memory of licensed AM broadcast radio station WRJQ (1570 AM) that aired an all-polka format from September 1, 1985, until January 30, 2002. The station was bought out by Woodward Communications, Inc. and changed its format to sports radio as "WSCO".

References

External links
WRJQ official website

RJQ
Internet radio stations in the United States
Polka